The North Side Fargo Builder's Residential Historic District is a  historic district with 103 contributing buildings located eight blocks north of downtown Fargo, North Dakota.  The district's name derives from the fact that the plans for the houses came from popular builder's pattern books.  The homes were built in the late 1920s and 1930s.  Tudor Revival is the predominant style, though Colonial Revival and American Foursquare architecture is also present.  The district was listed on the National Register of Historic Places in 1987.

See also
North Side Fargo High Style Residential Historic District

References

Houses on the National Register of Historic Places in North Dakota
Colonial Revival architecture in North Dakota
Tudor Revival architecture in North Dakota
Houses in Fargo, North Dakota
Historic districts on the National Register of Historic Places in North Dakota
National Register of Historic Places in Cass County, North Dakota
American Foursquare architecture
1925 establishments in North Dakota
Neighborhoods in North Dakota